The 84th running of the Liège–Bastogne–Liège cycling classic was held on 19 April 1998. It was the fourth leg of the 1998 UCI Road World Cup, coming between Paris–Roubaix and the Amstel Gold Race. As in the previous edition, Frenchman Laurent Jalabert was second; Rodolfo Massi completed the podium. 102 of 193 riders finished the race.

Race Summary
Russian Evgeni Berzin, winner of the  1994 Liège–Bastogne–Liège, moved away from the peloton after  and held a maximum lead of one minute over the chasing pack. On the Côte de La Redoute, seven riders broke clear from the field: Michele Bartoli and Laurent Jalabert – winner and runner-up of 1997 – Frank Vandenbroucke, Michael Boogerd, Rodolfo Massi, Francesco Casagrande and Laurent Dufaux. Jalabert counterattacked in the final kilometres, but was unable to join Bartoli, who soloed to his second consecutive win in La Doyenne.

Result

References

External links
 Official website

1998
1998 in Belgian sport
Liege-Bastogne-Liege
1998 in road cycling
April 1998 sports events in Europe